Olivia Lykke Nygaard (born 14 September 2001) is a Norwegian handball player, who plays for Fana and the Norwegian national team.

She was part of the Norwegian squad for the 2019 Women's U-19 European Handball Championship, where she received a bronze medal.

On 13 February 2023, Thorir Hergeirsson announced the squad for the last Golden League-tournament of the season 22/23 with the national team, with debutant Nygaard in the squad.

Nygaard was a Danish citizen until 2018, but after becoming a Norwegian citizen she quickly became a part of Norway's junior team because of her talent as a goalkeeper.

Starting from the 2023/24-season, Nygaard will join Champions League–debutant Storhamar HE.

On 5 March 2023, Nygaard made her debut on the Norwegian national team.

Achievements
Junior European Championship:
Bronze Medalist: 2019

References
 

2001 births
Living people
Norwegian female handball players
Norwegian people of Danish descent
Naturalised citizens of Norway
21st-century Norwegian women